Tunley is a surname. Notable people with the surname include:

David Tunley (born 1930), Australian musicologist and composer
Richard Frank Tunley (1879–1968), Australian blinds manufacturer and inventor of educational resources
Wayland Tunley (1937-2012), British architect